Interstate 20 (I-20) is a major thoroughfare through the central region of the US state of Mississippi. Spanning , it connects Jackson and I-55 with Vicksburg and the Mississippi River in the west and Meridian and I-59 in the east.

Route description
Interstate 20 enters in west from Tallulah, Louisiana into Vicksburg, Mississippi. It starts with an interchange with U.S. Route 61  South towards Natchez, Mississippi and then starts to make interchanges with the city's streets. Once I-20 is out of the city it leaves the city with an Partial cloverleaf interchange with U.S. Route 61 North towards Rolling Fork, Mississippi and Mississippi Highway 27 South towards Utica, Mississippi. Along the way with Mississippi Highway 22 towards Flora, Mississippi. It then enters the Jackson area with Clinton, Mississippi and makes an interchange with U.S. Route 80 towards Clinton-Raymond Road. It then goes into Jackson with a Partial cloverleaf interchange with Mississippi Highway 18 towards Raymond, Mississippi. After that, it makes its first interstate interchange with Interstate 220 (Mississippi), the city's bypass interstate. It then enters a spaghetti interchange with Interstate 55 and U.S. Route 49 South and it runs concurrent with both of those for 1 exit and then they all split in an interchange that Jackson calls "The Stack". This interchange splits making I-55 go north towards Downtown Jackson and Memphis, Tennessee. It makes I-20 continue east towards Forest, Mississippi and Meridian, Mississippi. Then, it makes US-49 go south towards Collins, Mississippi and Hattiesburg, Mississippi. After coming out of Jackson, the interstate makes interchanges with Mississippi Highway 468, Mississippi Highway 475, Mississippi Highway 18, U.S. Route 80, Mississippi Highway 43, Mississippi Highway 13, Mississippi Highway 481, Mississippi Highway 35, Mississippi Highway 15, and Mississippi Highway 503. As it enters Meridian, it makes its 4th and final interstate interchange with Interstate 59 towards Laurel, Mississippi and New Orleans. As it goes into the city, it makes highway interchanges with Mississippi Highway 19 and U.S. Route 11. It then goes into downtown making an interchange with Mississippi Highway 145. After this, it makes one interchange with 4 highways: Mississippi Highway 19, Mississippi Highway 39, U.S. Route 11, and U.S. Route 80. After the Jimmie Rodgers Parkway interchange, it encounters a cloverleaf interchange with U.S. Route 45 toward Quitman, Mississippi and Tupelo, Mississippi. After diamond interchanges with Russell-Mount Gilead Road in Russell and Will Garrett Road in Toomsuba, and a trumpet interchange with US 11/80 in Kewanee, the interstates encounter weigh stations in both directions before entering the Alabama state line heading towards Tuscaloosa, Alabama and Birmingham, Alabama (where it again runs concurrently with Interstate 59 in Alabama).

Exit list

Jackson spur route

Interstate 220 (I-220) in Mississippi is a loop around Jackson that provides an Interstate connection for I-55 and I-20. The northern terminus for the route is in the northern suburb of Ridgeland, at I-55 exit 104. The highway was Mississippi's first three-digit Interstate, complete by 1981.

The route of I-220 is defined in Mississippi Code § 65-3-3.

References

External links

 "Interstate 20 Eastbound." Mississippi @ SoutheastRoads.com
 "Interstate 20 Westbound." Mississippi @ Southeast Roads.com
 "I-20 Exits: Mississippi River to I-55"
 "I-20 Exits: I-55 South to I-59 South"

20
 Mississippi
Transportation in Warren County, Mississippi
Transportation in Hinds County, Mississippi
Transportation in Rankin County, Mississippi
Transportation in Scott County, Mississippi
Transportation in Newton County, Mississippi
Transportation in Lauderdale County, Mississippi